DLE or Dle may refer to:

 An ISO 269 envelope size
 DLE (company), a Japanese animation studio
 The IATA code for Dole–Jura Airport, France

Abbreviations
 Discoid lupus erythematosus, a chronic skin condition
 Data Link Escape, one of the C0 and C1 control codes
 Dry Low Emission, an emission reduction technology used in gas turbines
 Diccionario de la lengua española (Dictionary of the Spanish language)

Education
 District Level Examination, basic level final examination in Nepal

See also
"Dle Yaman", a traditional Armenian song rearranged by Komitas